Think About Love is a 1986 compilation of previously released Dolly Parton tracks, many of which were presented in remixes or alternate takes. RCA Records released the album after Parton had left the label.  The project was helmed by Mark Wright, an executive at RCA in Nashville at the time, and it remains unclear to what extent, if any, Parton was involved in the selection of songs or in the remixing process. The album is also unusual in that it only features one Parton original, "Do I Ever Cross Your Mind".

Of the eight tracks, only three appear to be unaltered from their original release: "It's Such a Heartache", "Tie Our Love (In a Double Knot)" and "Even a Fool Would Let Go". The other tracks have all been modified in various ways. "Think About Love" differs dramatically from the version on Real Love with the addition of the lyric "Think about love" before the bridge, a shortened instrumental section, much louder drum overdubs and a punchier mix overall. This version is actually the single remix and is the version that was played on the radio during its chart run and released on 45, but it has never been re-released on any CD anywhere in the world. "We Had It All" is a completely different vocal take from the version on The Great Pretender. Instead of the piano being the primary instrument, this time the song is driven by an acoustic guitar.  This remixed version of "We Had It All" was released as a single in the fall of 1986 and would reach number 31 on the country singles chart in the U.S.; it would be Parton's final charting single during her tenure with RCA.

Track listing

Chart performance

References

External links

Think About Love at Dolly Parton On-Line

1986 compilation albums
RCA Records compilation albums
Dolly Parton compilation albums